A Ticket in Tatts is a 1934 musical comedy film starring popular stage comedian George Wallace as an accident-prone stablehand. It was the last of three films Wallace made for F. W. Thring.

Plot
After being fired from his job at a grocer, George, gets a job as a stableboy at a local stud farm run by the Fleming family. He befriends the horse Hotspur who is a favourite to win the Melbourne Cup and develops a strong whistle that is used to make the horse run fast. Gangsters working for the villainous Coyle are determined to kidnap Hotspur but George figures it out and one is captured. To find out more information, George becomes a waiter at a cabaret where several ballet and vaudeville numbers are performed.

Dorothy Fleming is in love with author Harvey Walls, but is pursued by Brian Winters, the owner of rival horse Surefoot. Dorothy promises to marry Winters if Surefoot defeats Hotspur.

Coyle arranges for Peters, the Fleming's jockey, to be kidnapped and replaced with his jockey, Slade, with the aim of making sure Hotspur loses. Slade rides the horse and keeps Hotspur back in the field. However George uses his whistle to help the horse win. Dorothy and Harvey are united, as are George and Dorothy's maid.

Cast

George Wallace as George
Frank Harvey as Brian Winters
Campbell Copelin as Harvey Walls
Thelma Scott as Dorothy Fleming
Harold Meade as Mr Fleming
Marshall Crosby as Mr Summers
Nick Morton as Nick
Guy Hastings as Mr Coyle
Norman Shepherd as a crook
Stan Ray as a stablehand
John Dobbie as a stablehand
Darcy Kelway as a farmer
Dan Thomas as a crook
Noel Boyd as Harvey's secretary
Joyce Turner as Marjorie
Marie La Varre as Mrs Doyle
Dora Mostyn as Mrs Carter
Alec Walker as Peters
Frank Crowther as Slade
Royce Milton as head waiter
the Efftee Ballet

Production
The film marked the first appearance in an Australian feature by the actor and writer Frank Harvey.

The script was likely influenced by the real-life attempt of gangsters to kill the race horse Phar Lap prior to the Melbourne Cup.

Shooting began in July 1933.

Unlike many of Thring's films, much of the movie was shot on location, at a stuff dark near Melbourne, at Flemington Racecourse and the grounds of a Melbourne villa. Studio scenes were still shot at Efftee's studio at His Majesty's Theatre but it was the last time Thring used it – after the film he moved operations to the former Wattle Path Dance Palais at St Kilda which Efftee had bought for £23,000.

Release
The film was also known as High Stakes and released with the short Dear Old London. It proved reasonably popular at the box office, running for six weeks at a Melbourne cinema. Thring complained about difficulties of securing a decent release in Sydney.

It was released in England.

Wallace remained under contract for Efftee and appeared for them on stage in Collits' Inn. Plans were also announced to star him in the films Ginger Murdoch and The Black Sheep. However Thring died in 1936 before these could be made.

Wallace then made two films for Cinesound which followed the story telling formula of A Ticket in Tatts: "George is given a simple labourer's job... Quite innocently is fired...  He then becomes involved in a simple wish-fulfilment device... the device is complicated by an equally simple set of stereotyped gangsters who have no motivation beyond innate greed for greater wealth, and in each situation they are foiled, usually accidentally, by George and his friends."

References

Fitzpatrick, Peter, The Two Frank Thrings, Monash University, 2012

External links
A Ticket in Tatts in the Internet Movie Database
A Ticket in Tatts at Australian Screen Online
A Ticket in Tatts at Oz Movies
Complete script at National Archives of Australia

1934 films
Australian musical comedy films
1934 musical comedy films
Films directed by F. W. Thring
Australian black-and-white films